The 1913–14 Irish Cup was the 34th edition of the premier knock-out cup competition in Irish football. 

Glentoran won the tournament for the 1st time, defeating Linfield 3–1 in the final.

Results

First round

|}

Replay

|}

Second replay

|}

Third replay

|}

Fourth replay

|}

Quarter-finals

|}

Replay

|}

Semi-finals

|}

Replay

|}

Second replay

|}

Third replay

|}

Final

References

External links
 Northern Ireland Cup Finals. Rec.Sport.Soccer Statistics Foundation (RSSSF)

Irish Cup seasons
1913–14 domestic association football cups
1913–14 in Irish association football